The Jangmigye is a breed of long-tail fowl that originated in Mahan of ancient Korea.

Korea's people's call 긴꼬리닭 (Ginkkori-dak) in a pure Korean. "긴" is long, "꼬리" is tail, "닭" is chicken. It appears in a single-comb variety with Black Breasted Red plumage, White . The birds appear in Black-breasted Red (comb is single). Their legs are dark gray (lead), eyes red-brown and earlobes describes as red mixing white or white. Males weigh 1.2–1.8 kg and females 800g–1.3 kg.

The ancient Chinese book (Book of the Later Han) "馬韓人知田蠶, 作緜布. 出大栗如梨. 有長尾雞, 尾長五尺." is a record.

This will be translated into English.

馬韓人知田蠶, 作緜布. : The Mahan People know about agriculture and sericulture, and can produce cotton.

出大栗如梨. : Produces a very large chestnut, as big as a pear.

有長尾雞, 尾長五尺 : It is a long-tailed chicken, with a tail length of approx. 5 ft.

and Charles Varat (French trip, A.D 1888–1889) were recorded Chungcheong-do specialties of The Joseon Dynasty as long-tailed chickens (The length of the tail is 150 cm).

Chicken breeds
Chicken breeds originating in Korea

ja:長尾鶏